Sattes is an unincorporated community in Kanawha County, West Virginia, United States. Its post office  is closed.

Sattes got its start when the railroad was extended to that point.

References 

Unincorporated communities in West Virginia
Unincorporated communities in Kanawha County, West Virginia